The third season of Supermodel Me or (Supermodel Me: Fast & Furious) aired in 2013, with the shooting location in Singapore.

From this season: the show will aired from 30 to 60 minute and the entire judging panel change (Lisa Selesner will replace Charmaine Harn as the host with 3 brand new resident judges: Actress & Model Ase Wang, Model & TV Host Dominic Lau and Editor-in-Chief of Elle Singapore Sharon Lim). Special appearances for the show included: Deborah Henry, Wykidd Song, Marcus A. C, Junita Simon, Jennifer Tse, Joanne Peh, Utt, Qi Qi, Elisabeth Gwee, Rebecca Lim, Ana R, Lum May Yee, Danielle Graham, Daniel Boey, Cindy Bishop, Kevin Ou. Same as the previous season, this third season was aired in HD quality on MYX TV Channel across Asia.

This third season has received some nominations for "Best Cross-Platform Content" at the Asian Television Awards 2012 and "Best Non-Fiction" at the International Digital Emmy Awards in 2013.

It was announced that Supermodelme season 3 would make its first foray into China through Sohu and Qiyi and the United States via MYX TV, with the network purchasing the rights to all three seasons of the series. In addition, Supermodelme announced in July 2012 a collaboration with Audi Fashion Festival (AFF) 2013 - the largest annual fashion event in Singapore.

This season will feature 12 contestants; two each from Australia, Hong Kong, Singapore and Thailand, one each from Malaysia, Myanmar, the Philippines and Vietnam. The prizes for this cycle were a modelling contract with the top agency in Singapore, a modelling contract with Model One in Hong Kong and a cash prize of 20.000S$.

The winner was 18-year-old Tiffany Leigh Warne from Australia.

Contestants
(Ages stated are at time of contest)

Results

 The contestant was eliminated
 The contestant was immune from elimination
 The contestant was disqualified from the competition 
 The contestant was originally eliminated from the competition but was saved 
 The contestant won the competition

 In episode 3, Jacqueline and Lynn broke the competitions rules by sneaking out of the model's house without permission. Therefore, the producers have to ask 8 remaining girls to vote the one who should be disqualified. As a result, Lynn got the most votes and is disqualified. At the elimination, Deanna, who was eliminated in previous episode, return into the competition.
 In episode 9, Asha was originally eliminated from the competition but was saved by Lisa
 Episode 11 was the recap episode.

Photo shoot guide
Episode 1 photo shoot: La Perla swimwear at the abandoned house
Episode 2 photo shoot: Velvet Underground shoot inside Zouk Club in groups with male models
Episode 3 photo shoot: Running in the forest on a treadmill runway
Episode 4 photo shoot: La Perla Lingerie With a Horse
Episode 5 photo shoot: Last kiss inside a car with Utt
Episode 6 photo shoot: Underwater
Episode 7 photo shoot: Roller Girls
Episode 8 photo shoot: Bank Robbery 
Episode 9 photo shoot: Wire Stunt Fighter
Episode 10 photo shoot: Rockstars
Episode 12 photo shoot: Beautiful chaos at the race track

Average  call-out order
Final three is not included.

Bottom three/two

 The contestant was eliminated after their first time in the bottom two/three
 The contestant was eliminated after their second time in the bottom two/three
 The contestant was eliminated after their third time in the bottom two/three 
 The contestant was eliminated after their fourth time in the bottom two/three
 The contestant was eliminated after their fifth time in the bottom two/three
 The contestant was eliminated in the first round of elimination and placed third
 The contestant was eliminated and placed as the runner-up

References

2012 Singaporean television seasons